96.7 the Eagle may refer to

WKGL broadcasting to Rockford, Illinois

WMJT broadcasting to northern Michigan